Adrian Moody (born 29 September 1982) is an English former footballer, who played as a defender. Whilst he mostly played in the Welsh Premier League, he made appearances in the English Football League with Wrexham.

Career
After making his way up through Wrexham's Youth Team, Moody made his Wrexham debut at the age of 18 away at Reading. He would make a total of four League appearances for the club.

After leaving Wrexham, Moody would move to Welsh Premier League club Rhyl for a year, before then moving to fellow WPL club Newtown, where he spent three seasons.

In 2006, he resigned for Rhyl, spending a season there before taking a break from football. He returned in 2009 to spend a season at Prestatyn Town.

References

Living people
English Football League players
Cymru Premier players
Wrexham A.F.C. players
Rhyl F.C. players
Newtown A.F.C. players
Prestatyn Town F.C. players
1982 births
Association football defenders
English footballers